Reisabad (also Romanized as Re’īsābād; also known as Morteẕáābād (Persian: مرتضي اباد) and Rīsābād) is a village in Eslamiyeh Rural District, in the Central District of Rafsanjan County, Kerman Province, Iran. At the 2006 census, its population was 10, in 4 families.

References 

Populated places in Rafsanjan County